Progressive vaccinia  is a rare cutaneous condition caused by the vaccinia virus, characterized by painless but progressive necrosis and ulceration.

Presentation

Complications
Opportunistic fungal, protozoal, or bacterial infections and the vaccinia virus itself may lead to septic shock and disseminated intravascular coagulation, in addition to necrosis and ulcerated skin tissue. Some of these tissues may eventually become large, requiring not only a skin graft but surgical removal of the destroyed tissue, in order to avoid graft-versus-host disease in organ transplanted patients, in whom immunosuppressive therapy would otherwise have to be discontinued to allow healing of the wound.

Pathophysiology
Vaccinia is introduced into the skin by means of multiple punctures of a bifurcated needle. The virus replicates in the basal layer and disseminates from cell to cell, causing necrosis and the formation of fluid-filled vesicles. Nonetheless, the initial spread of the virus is slowed by innate antiviral mechanisms, and, by the second week, the cell-mediated immune response begins to eliminate infected cells. Neutrophils, macrophages, and lymphocytes infiltrate the inoculation site, forming a confluent pustule and releasing cytokines and chemokines that cause hyperemia and edema in surrounding tissues. This may initially manifest into complaints of malaise and other mild constitutional symptoms, fever, vomiting, and tender enlarged axillary lymph nodes. Some vaccinees develop additional local “satellite” pustules that resolve along with the primary lesion.

The virus may gain access to the blood at an early stage, and secondary skin lesions, which follow the same evolution as the inoculation site, may appear across the body. Bacteria, like Staphylococcus aureus, may infect the ulcerated, and necrotic lesions. Coalescent lesions may cover large portions of the body with extensive tissue destruction. Although some vaccinia viruses commonly disseminate through the bloodstream, the NYCBOH strain reportedly causes only limited viremia in a small percentage of recipients during the period of pustule formation. The inflammatory process reaches its peak by days 10–12 after vaccination and begins to resolve by day 14, with the shedding of the scab and other pustules by day 21. This sequence of events, which simulates the development of smallpox "pock", is known as a “take” reaction. A successful "take"  is required for the development of antivaccinia antibody and cell-mediated responses.

Treatment
In addition to a skin graft, some medications also work. Among antiviral substances, cidofovir showed some effect in preliminary studies. Apart from treating opportunistic infections with anti-viral, and antibiotic medications, for HIV or immunocompromised (or at the very least iatrogenic immunosuppression like cancer and autoimmune disease) people, immediate highly active antiretroviral therapy (HAART) in HIV patients and withdrawal of immunosuppressive therapy accompanied by aggressive administration of VIG are given to save the patient's life. Intensive care and supportive treatment are required. VIG is given at up to 10 ml / kg body weight.

See also 
 Vaccinia
 Skin lesion
 Necrosis
 Smallpox
 Vaccination
 Chicken pox
 Cowpox- a virus closely related to the vaccinia virus and belongs to the same genus Orthopoxvirus.

Note

References 

Virus-related cutaneous conditions
Necrosis
Rare diseases
Rare infectious diseases
Vaccinia